The 2022 Barking and Dagenham London Borough Council election took place on 5 May 2022. All 51 members of Barking and Dagenham London Borough Council were elected. The elections took place alongside local elections in the other London boroughs and elections to local authorities across the United Kingdom.

In the previous election in 2018, the Labour Party maintained its longstanding control of the council, winning all fifty-one seats. The 2022 election took place under new election boundaries with the Labour Party once again winning all seats.

Background

History 

The thirty-two London boroughs were established in 1965 by the London Government Act 1963. They are the principal authorities in Greater London and have responsibilities including education, housing, planning, highways, social services, libraries, recreation, waste, environmental health and revenue collection. Some of the powers are shared with the Greater London Authority, which also manages passenger transport, police and fire.

Barking and Dagenham has been controlled by the Labour Party since its establishment. The Conservatives, Liberal Democrats, independents and residents associations have also held seats on the borough. The 2006 election saw the British National Party winning twelve of the fifty-one seats, none of which they held in the 2010 election, in which every seat was won by Labour. In the 2014 election and the most recent election in 2018 all fifty-one seats continued to be won by the Labour Party. The party won 74.4% of the vote across the borough. The Conservatives won 23.6% of the vote and no seats. The incumbent leader of the council is the Labour councillor Darren Rodwell, who had held that position since 2014.

Council term
Bill Turner, a councillor for Thames ward, resigned in 2021. A by-election to replace him was held in 2021 alongside that year's mayoral election and London Assembly election. The London Assembly member Andrew Boff was selected as the Conservative candidate. He called the election a "referendum on democracy", expressing his opposition to the Labour council's introduction of a Controlled Parking Zone in the ward. The Labour candidate Fatuma Nalule won the election, with Boff coming second.

Along with most other London boroughs, Barking and Dagenham was subject to a boundary review ahead of the 2022 election. The Local Government Boundary Commission for England concluded that the council should maintain fifty-one seats, but produced new election boundaries following a period of consultation. The plans will see two additional wards, resulting in six of the nineteen new wards being represented by two councillors and the rest being represented by three councillors. Boundaries changed for every ward except for Longbridge.

Electoral process
Barking and Dagenham, as is the case all other London borough councils, elects all of its councillors at once every four years, with the previous election having taken place in 2018. The election took place by multi-member first-past-the-post voting, with each ward being represented by two or three councillors. Electors will have as many votes as there are councillors to be elected in their ward, with the top two or three being elected.

All registered electors (British, Irish, Commonwealth and European Union citizens) living in London aged 18 or over were entitled to vote in the election. People who live at two addresses in different councils, such as university students with different term-time and holiday addresses, were entitled to be registered for and vote in elections in both local authorities. Voting in-person at polling stations took place from 7:00 to 22:00 on election day, and voters will be able to apply for postal votes or proxy votes in advance of the election.

Previous council composition

Results summary

Ward results
Statements of persons nominated were published on 6 April 2022. Incumbent councillors are marked with an asterisk (*).

Abbey

Alibon

Barking Riverside

Beam

Becontree

Chadwell Heath

Eastbrook and Rush Green

Eastbury

Gascoigne

Goresbrook

Heath

Longbridge

Mayesbrook

Northbury

Parsloes

Thames View

Valence

Village

Whalebone

By-elections between 2022 and 2026

Heath

The by-election was called following the death of Cllr. Olawale Martins.

References

Council elections in the London Borough of Barking and Dagenham
Barking